Jana preciosa is a moth in the family Eupterotidae. It was described by Per Olof Christopher Aurivillius in 1893. It is found in Cameroon, the Republic of the Congo, the Democratic Republic of the Congo, Kenya, Tanzania and Uganda.

References

Moths described in 1893
Janinae